Christchurch College or Christ Church College may refer to:
 Christ Church, Oxford, a constituent college of the University of Oxford in England
 Canterbury Christ Church University, Anglican new university in Canterbury, Kent, England
 Christ Church College, Matale, a mixed government school located in Matale, Sri Lanka
 Christ Church College, Kanpur, an affiliate of Kanpur University in Uttar Pradesh, India

See also 
 Christ Church (disambiguation)
 Christ College (disambiguation)
 Christ's College (disambiguation)